Lương Trung Tuấn is a retired Vietnamese footballer. The first Vietnamese player played for V.League 1 in club Becamex Bình Dương

Honours

Club
Hoàng Anh Gia Lai
V-League: 2003
Bình Dương F.C.
V-League: 2007, 2008
Vietnamese Super Cup: 2007, 2008

References

1977 births
Living people
People from Trà Vinh province
Vietnamese footballers
Hoang Anh Gia Lai FC players
Becamex Binh Duong FC players
V.League 1 players
Luong Trung Tuan
Luong Trung Tuan
Vietnamese expatriate sportspeople in Thailand
Expatriate footballers in Thailand
Vietnamese expatriate footballers
Vietnam international footballers
Association football defenders